Mynhardt Mbeumuna Kawanivi (born 3 March 1984) is a Namibian long distance runner who specialises in the marathon. He competed in the men's marathon event at the 2016 Summer Olympics where he finished in 70th place with a time of 2:20:45.

References

External links
 

1984 births
Living people
Namibian male long-distance runners
Namibian male marathon runners
Place of birth missing (living people)
Athletes (track and field) at the 2016 Summer Olympics
Olympic athletes of Namibia